This is a partial discography of Der fliegende Holländer (The Flying Dutchman) by Richard Wagner. The list includes live and studio performances in audio and/or video recordings.

Recordings

References 
Notes

Opera discographies
Operas by Richard Wagner
Flying Dutchman